Murder with Mirrors is a 1985 British-American television film starring Helen Hayes (in her final film role) and Bette Davis. It is based on Agatha Christie's novel They Do It with Mirrors, using the novel's American title. The novel has been dramatized on two separated series, Miss Marple and Agatha Christie's Marple. They used the novel's original title.

Synopsis
Miss Marple reunites with her friend Carrie Louise Serrocold at her country mansion. Christian Gulbranson, Marple's lawyer, persuades her to visit the estate of his stepmother, Carrie Louise. Her devoted husband Lewis has turned the manor house Stonygates into a halfway house for criminals. He confides to Marple and suspects someone poisoning Carrie with arsenic. After Christian dies, a killer is at large in a house full of suspects.

Cast 
 Helen Hayes as Miss Jane Marple
 Bette Davis as Carrie Louise Serrocold 
 John Mills as Lewis Serrocold 
 Leo McKern as Inspector Curry 
 Liane Langland as Gina Markham 
 John Laughlin as Wally Markham 
 Dorothy Tutin as Mildred Strete 
 Anton Rodgers as Dr. Max Hargrove 
 Frances de la Tour as Miss Bellaver 
 John Woodvine as Christian Gulbranson 
 James Coombes as Steven Restarick 
 Tim Roth as Edgar Lawson

Production

It was filmed entirely on location in England. Brocket Hall in Hertfordshire featured as Stonygates. Several locations in London can be seen, like Carlton House Terrace, Trafalgar Square and Westminster Bridge. Turville, Seer Green and Skirmett, all in Buckinghamshire were used for the film.

References

External links

1985 television films
1985 films
1980s mystery films
American mystery films
British television films
British mystery films
Films based on Miss Marple books
CBS network films
Television shows based on works by Agatha Christie
Films directed by Dick Lowry
Films scored by Richard Rodney Bennett
1980s English-language films
1980s American films
1980s British films